Razor blade may refer to:
 A blade for a razor
 The Razor Blade, a 1920s racing car
 Razor blade steel, a type of steel originally designed specifically for razor blades